Breathe Easy is an album by vibraphonist Cal Tjader which was recorded in 1977 and released on the Galaxy label in the following year.

Reception

The AllMusic review by Scott Yanow stated "Vibraphonist Cal Tjader had a chance to display his jazz roots on this straightahead quintet set. Tjader stretches out in conventional fashion on six familiar standards ... The interpretations overall are relaxed, tasteful and swinging but somewhat uneventful and without any real surprises".

Track listing
 "Tangerine" (Victor Schertzinger, Johnny Mercer) – 8:59
 "If You Could See Me Now" (Tadd Dameron) – 8:44
 "The Way You Look Tonight" (Jerome Kern, Dorothy Fields) – 7:09
 "When Lights Are Low" (Benny Carter, Spencer Williams) – 8:45
 "Just Friends" (John Klenner, Sam M. Lewis) – 6:48
 "Goodbye" (Gordon Jenkins) – 6:52

Personnel
Cal Tjader – vibraphone
Allen Smith – trumpet
Hank Jones – piano, electric piano
Monty Budwig – bass
Shelly Manne – drums

References

Galaxy Records albums
Cal Tjader albums
1978 albums